Islington London Borough Council is the local authority for the London Borough of Islington in Greater London, England.  The council was created by the London Government Act 1963 and replaced two local authorities: Finsbury Metropolitan Borough Council and Islington Metropolitan Borough Council.

It is a London borough council, one of 32 in the United Kingdom capital of London. Islington is divided into 17 wards, each electing three councillors. Following the May 2022 election, Islington Council comprises 48 Labour Party councillors and 3 Green Party councillors. Of these 51 councillors, the Leader of the Council is Councillor Kaya Comer-Schwartz, while the Mayor is Councillor Marian Spall.

History

There have previously been a number of local authorities responsible for the Islington area. The current local authority was first elected in 1964, a year before formally coming into its powers and prior to the creation of the London Borough of Islington on 1 April 1965. The present Islington Borough Council replaced Finsbury Metropolitan Borough Council and Islington Metropolitan Borough Council. Both were created in 1900, in Islington the borough council replaced the parish vestry. Finsbury had a more convoluted history with the metropolitan borough council replacing the Vestry of the Parish of St Luke, the Vestry of the Parish of Clerkenwell and the Holborn District Board of Works (for Glasshouse Yard and St Sepulchre).

It was envisaged that through the London Government Act 1963 Islington as a London local authority would share power with the Greater London Council. The split of powers and functions meant that the Greater London Council was responsible for "wide area" services such as fire, ambulance, flood prevention, and refuse disposal; with the local authorities responsible for "personal" services such as social care, libraries, cemeteries and refuse collection. This arrangement lasted until 1986 when Islington Council gained responsibility for some services that had been provided by the Greater London Council, such as waste disposal. Islington became an education authority in 1990. Since 2000 the Greater London Authority has taken some responsibility for highways and planning control from the council, but within the English local government system the council remains a "most purpose" authority in terms of the available range of powers and functions.

Powers and functions
The local authority derives its powers and functions from the London Government Act 1963 and subsequent legislation, and has the powers and functions of a London borough council. It sets council tax and as a billing authority also collects precepts for Greater London Authority functions and business rates. It sets planning policies which complement Greater London Authority and national policies, and decides on almost all planning applications accordingly.  It is a local education authority  and is also responsible for council housing, social services, libraries, waste collection and disposal, traffic, and most roads and environmental health.

Politics

Islington Council is elected every four years, with 48 councillors being elected from 16 wards. From 1964 to 1998, Labour controlled the council, apart from a 3-year period of Conservative control from 1968 to 1971, and a brief period of SDP control between 1981 and 1982, following the defection of Labour councillors together with MP Michael O'Halloran. The Liberal Democrats then had a majority from 1999 to the 2006 election, but continued to run the council as a minority administration until 2010 when Labour won a majority. In 2013, Labour won a seat from the Liberal Democrats in a by-election, and one Liberal Democrat councillor resigned the whip to sit as an independent, leaving the political composition of the Council as 36 Labour, 11 Liberal Democrat and 1 Independent. As of the 2022 election the council is composed of the following councillors:

In November 2020, former mayor Rakhia Ismail, who was originally elected as a Labour councillor for Holloway ward, defected to the Conservative Party, giving the party their first representation on the council since 1994.

In May 2021, Kaya Comer-Schwartz was elected unopposed as Leader of the Council, replacing Richard Watts.

See also
London Capital Credit Union

References

External links 
Islington Council – Official website

Local authorities in London
London borough councils
Politics of the London Borough of Islington
Leader and cabinet executives
Local education authorities in England
Billing authorities in England